Sociedad Deportiva Portmany is a Spanish football club based in Sant Antoni de Portmany, in the island of Ibiza, in the Balearic Islands. Founded in 1923, it plays in Tercera División RFEF – Group 11, holding home games at Campo Municipal de Futbol Sant Antoni, with a capacity of 890 spectators.

Season to season

21 season in Tercera División
1 season in Tercera División RFEF

References

External links
 
Soccerway team profile

Sport in Ibiza
Football clubs in the Balearic Islands
Association football clubs established in 1923
1923 establishments in Spain